The 2007 Sky Bet World Grand Prix was the tenth staging of the PDC World Grand Prix which took place between 8–14 October 2007. It was the seventh year that the event was being staged at the Citywest Hotel, Dublin, Ireland. Phil Taylor went into the event as defending champion having won it for the previous two years - and seven times in all, but suffered a surprise first round defeat to Adrian Gray.

James Wade followed up his success at the 2007 World Matchplay by adding this title to his collection. He beat World Champion Raymond van Barneveld in the semi-final and Terry Jenkins in the final. Jenkins suffered his fifth televised final defeat in twelve months as his search for his first major title continued.

The top 24 players in the PDC Order of Merit qualified automatically. There were four further qualifiers from the PDPA Players Championship Order of Merit (the best performers from up to 20 non-televised events during the year) and there were four PDPA Irish qualifiers. The All-Ireland qualifiers were held on 16 September.

As in previous years, the format of the tournament features much shorter first round matches (best of three sets) and players must start each leg on a double, as well as finish on a double.

Prize money
The 2007 event has an increased prize fund of £200,000.

Qualification

Race for the Premier League
The World Grand Prix is the cut-off point for qualification for the 2008 Premier League. The top six players in the world rankings after this tournament will seal automatic qualification for the lucrative event. Phil Taylor, Raymond van Barneveld, James Wade, Terry Jenkins and Peter Manley all looked assured of a place - but a good run at this tournament for any number of players could have stolen the last guaranteed place in the league. Adrian Lewis secured the spot when John Part lost in the semi-finals. Part needed to win the event to climb to sixth in the rankings. Two further players will receive a wildcard at a later date.

Draw

References

External links
World Grand Prix results & reports Planetdarts.tv

World Grand Prix (darts)
World Grand Prix Darts